"23 Island" is a song by American rapper JayDaYoungan. It was released on August 21, 2019 as the second single from his mixtape, Misunderstood (2019). It also appears on his debut studio album Baby23 (2020).

Composition
Aron A. of HotNewHipHop described that in the song, "JaydaYoungan brings his southern melodies to a guitar-based production that has an R&B vibe to it."

Music video
The music video was released on August 20, 2019. It sees JayDaYoungan holding stacks of cash and smoking on a beach and by a pool, and singing to his girlfriend.

Charts

Certifications

References

2019 singles
2019 songs